Ageyev (masculine) or Ageyeva (feminine) is a Russian surname. Variants of this surname include Aggeyev/Aggeyeva (/), Ageyenko, Ageyenkov/Ageyenkova (/), Ageykin/Ageykina (/), Agin/Agina (/), Agish, Agishev/Agisheva (/), Agishin/Agishina (/), Agishchev/Agishcheva (/), Agushev/Agusheva (/), Ogiyenko, and Ogishin/Ogishina (/).

All these surnames derive from various forms of the Christian male given name Aggey (from the Biblical Hebrew word meaning festive), although it's also possible that the forms starting with "Agish-", "Agishch-", and "Agush-" were derived from the given name Agapy or Agafon. The following people share this surname:
Aleksandr Ageyev (born 1996), Russian association football player
Alla Ageyeva, birth name of Masha Rasputina (born 1965), Russian pop singer
Ivan Ageyev (born 1990), Russian ice hockey player
M. Ageyev (died 1973), pen name of Mark Levi, Russian novelist
Natalya Ageyeva, the artistic director of the Russian Chamber Music Foundation of Seattle
Sergey Ageyev (born 1968), Russian association football player
Sergei Ageyev (ice hockey) (Sergey Ageyev) (born 1984), Russian ice hockey player
Svetlana Ageyeva, Soviet actress cast in the 1965 Soviet comedy Operation Y and Shurik's Other Adventures
Viktor Ageyev (born 1936), Soviet Olympic water polo player
Vladimir Ageyev (born 1932), Soviet Chuvash painter
Yevgeny Ageyev (born 1976), Russian association football player

See also
Ageyevo, several inhabited localities in Russia

References

Notes

Sources
И. М. Ганжина (I. M. Ganzhina). "Словарь современных русских фамилий" (Dictionary of Modern Russian Last Names). Москва, 2001. 



Russian-language surnames